A hazard analysis is used as the first step in a process used to assess risk. The result of a hazard analysis is the identification of different types of hazards. A hazard is a potential condition and exists or not (probability is 1 or 0). It may, in single existence or in combination with other hazards (sometimes called events) and conditions, become an actual Functional Failure or Accident (Mishap). The way this exactly happens in one particular sequence is called a scenario. This scenario has a probability (between 1 and 0) of occurrence. Often a system has many potential failure scenarios. It also is assigned a classification, based on the worst case severity of the end condition. Risk is the combination of probability and severity. Preliminary risk levels can be provided in the hazard analysis. The validation, more precise prediction (verification) and acceptance of risk is determined in the risk assessment (analysis). The main goal of both is to provide the best selection of means of controlling or eliminating the risk. The term is used in several engineering specialties, including avionics, chemical process safety, safety engineering, reliability engineering and food safety.

Hazards and risk
A hazard is defined as a "Condition, event, or circumstance that could lead to or contribute to an unplanned or undesirable event."  Seldom does a single hazard cause an accident or a functional failure. More often an accident or operational failure occurs as the result of a sequence of causes. A hazard analysis will consider system state, for example operating environment, as well as failures or malfunctions.

While in some cases, safety or reliability risk can be eliminated, in most cases a certain degree of risk must be accepted. In order to quantify expected costs before the fact, the potential consequences and the probability of occurrence must be considered. Assessment of risk is made by combining the severity of consequence with the likelihood of occurrence in a matrix. Risks that fall into the "unacceptable" category (e.g., high severity and high probability) must be mitigated by some means to reduce the level of safety risk.

IEEE STD-1228-1994 Software Safety Plans prescribes industry best practices for conducting software safety hazard analyses to help ensure safety requirements and attributes are defined and specified for inclusion in software that commands, controls or monitors critical functions. When software is involved in a system, the development and design assurance of that software is often governed by DO-178C. The severity of consequence identified by the hazard analysis establishes the criticality level of the software. Software criticality levels range from A to E, corresponding to the severity of Catastrophic to No Safety Effect. Higher levels of rigor are required for level A and B software and corresponding functional tasks and work products is the system safety domain are used as objective evidence of meeting safety criteria and requirements.

In 2009 a leading edge commercial standard was promulgated based on decades of proven system safety processes in DoD and NASA. ANSI/GEIA-STD-0010-2009 (Standard Best Practices for System Safety Program Development and Execution) is a demilitarized commercial best practice that uses proven holistic, comprehensive and tailored approaches for hazard prevention, elimination and control. It is centered around the hazard analysis and functional based safety process.

Severity definitions - Safety Related examples
(aviation)

(medical devices)

Likelihood of occurrence examples
(aviation)

(medical devices)

See also
Environmental hazard

 (Software Considerations in Airborne Systems and Equipment Certification)

 (similar to DO-178B, but for hardware)
 (System safety assessment process)
 (System development process)

Further reading

References

External links
 CFR, Title 29-Labor, Part 1910--Occupational Safety and Health Standards, § 1910.119  U.S. OSHA regulations regarding "Process safety management of highly hazardous chemicals" (especially Appendix C).
 FAA Order 8040.4 establishes FAA safety risk management policy.
 The FAA publishes a System Safety Handbook that provides a good overview of the system safety process used by the agency.
 IEEE 1584-2002 Standard which provides guidelines for doing arc flash hazard assessment.

 
Avionics
Process safety
Safety engineering
Software quality
Occupational safety and health
Reliability engineering